Alain Filhol (born 15 May 1951) is a French former racing driver.

References

1951 births
Living people
French racing drivers
International Formula 3000 drivers
Place of birth missing (living people)
Sportspeople from Toulouse
20th-century French people

OAK Racing drivers